Indian Creek Recreation Area is a recreation area located inside Alexander State Forest in Rapides Parish near Woodworth, Louisiana. It includes Indian Creek Reservoir, which is an artificial lake developed with the aid of the Louisiana Forestry Commission, the Rapides Parish Police Jury, and the Lower West Red River Soil and Water Conservation District. The lake was created in 1970 as a reservoir for agricultural irrigation and for recreation purposes.

External links
Alexander State Forest & Indian Creek Recreation Area
Alexander State Forest (stateparks.com)

References

Protected areas of Louisiana
Protected areas of Rapides Parish, Louisiana
Reservoirs in Louisiana
Landforms of Rapides Parish, Louisiana